The Return of Al Hurricane "EL" Godfather is the fourteenth album released by the New Mexican musician Al Hurricane in 1980?. Tracks from this album often appear on the NPR radio station KRWG's bilingual Latin music program "Fiesta".

Track listing

References

Al Hurricane albums
New Mexico music albums
1980 albums